Gra Rueb (4 September 1885 – 26 December 1972) was a Dutch sculptor. Her work was part of the sculpture event in the art competition at the 1928 Summer Olympics. Rueb's work was included in the 1939 exhibition and sale Onze Kunst van Heden (Our Art of Today) at the Rijksmuseum in Amsterdam.

References

1885 births
1972 deaths
20th-century Dutch sculptors
Dutch women sculptors
Olympic competitors in art competitions
People from Breda
20th-century Dutch women
20th-century Dutch people